The men's hammer throw event at the 1938 British Empire Games was held on 10 February at the Sydney Cricket Ground in Sydney, Australia.

Results

References

Athletics at the 1938 British Empire Games
1938